Gail Catherine McLaughlin is an American nuclear astrophysicist specializing in astrophysical neutrinos and the r-process for nucleosynthesis. She is Distinguished University Professor of Physics at North Carolina State University.

Education and career
McLaughlin majored in physics at Princeton University, graduating in 1991. She completed her Ph.D. in physics in 1996, at the University of California, San Diego. Her dissertation, Physics of Massive Stars and Supernovae: Weak Interactions and Stability Analysis, was supervised by George M. Fuller.

After postdoctoral research at the University of Washington and TRIUMF, she became a research scientist at Stony Brook University before moving to North Carolina State University in 2001. She was named Distinguished University Professor in 2017.

Recognition
McLaughlin was named a Fellow of the American Physical Society (APS) in 2009, after a nomination from the APS Division of Nuclear Physics, "for her work in elucidating the role of neutrinos in nucleosynthesis in supernovae and black hole accretion disks, and for her studies of the potential of low energy beta-beams in neutrino physics".

References

External links

Year of birth missing (living people)
Living people
American physicists
American women physicists
Princeton University alumni
University of California, San Diego alumni
North Carolina State University faculty
Fellows of the American Physical Society
21st-century American women